To Better Days is the fourth studio album by American rock band Slaves, released on August 7, 2020, through SBG Records as a follow-up to their third studio album, Beautiful Death (2018). The album was produced by Jimmy Alexander and is the band's first release to feature lead vocalist Matt McAndrew, rhythm guitarist Felipe Sanchez, and drummer Zachary Baker. It is also their first release since the departure of original lead vocalist Jonny Craig, who left the group in January 2019.

It's the band's final album released under the name Slaves, having changed their name to Rain City on October 15, 2021, then finally to Rain City Drive on November 6, 2021. The album is marketed under the Rain City Drive catalog on digital retailers; in such places, the Slaves logo has been removed from the cover art.

Track listing

Credits and personnel
Slaves
 Matt McAndrew – lead vocals
 Colin Vieira – bass guitar
 Weston Richmond – lead guitar
 Felipe Sanchez – rhythm guitar
 Zachary Baker – drums, percussion

Additional personnel
 Jimmy Alexander – producer

References

2020 albums
Slaves (American band) albums
The Orchard (company) albums